Everytime We Touch is the first album by German Eurodance trio Cascada (consisting of DJ Manian, Natalie Horler and Yanou). It was released on 21 February 2006. Recording sessions for the album took place from 2004 to 2006, most of which was recorded after the third single from the album "Everytime We Touch" rose to popularity. The entire album was produced by Yanou and DJ Manian, containing heavily of up-tempo Eurodance tracks, many of which are covers of hit songs from the 1980s and 1990s of the synthpop, Eurodance, and rock genres. Musically, the album is composed of dance tracks with thick Euro synths, trance beats that clock in at over 140 beats per minute and Europop lyrics. Lyrically, the album is composed of songs about love and dance floor euphoria.

Critical reception of the album has been mixed, with many critics disliking the repetitive beats and what they saw as filler. Most critics did admire, however, its chart success for a dance album in the tough US music market. The album has sold about 2 million copies worldwide. There was a total of seven singles released from the album. "Miracle" and "Everytime We Touch" were released in America and were the only singles that received gold and platinum certifications. Along with "Truly, Madly, Deeply", these singles attained notable chart success internationally, peaking in the top ten in countries like the United Kingdom, Ireland and Sweden. "A Neverending Dream" and "How Do You Do!" achieved minor chart success in Ireland, the United Kingdom and Austria respectively.

Critical reception 

Sharon Mawer from Allmusic gave the album a mixed review and said the album's songs were for "dancing to" in a "club with lights flashing and people all around" but said that "after an hour of the same repetitive beat, one's senses can become a little jaded." Dom Passantino from Stylus Magazine gave the album a C+ and said the album had "a lot of filler" and called "Everytime We Touch" unoriginal. Ken Barnes of USA Today, however, awarded the album 3 out of 4 stars and said that "you couldn't ask for a more insanely infectious concoction."

Chart performance 
The album was accidentally released on iTunes for digital download on 11 February 2006, ten days before its scheduled release, in what was said to be a computer error. The album entered the Billboard 200 at number 67, selling over 17,000 copies in its first week. It has gone on to sell over 100,000 copies in the US.

In the United Kingdom, the album entered the charts at #6. It then went on to peak at #2. It spent 28 weeks in the UK Albums Top 75, and 35 weeks in the Ireland Albums Top 75 (where it peaked at #1). The album went on to sell over 600,000 copies in the UK, achieving Platinum Certification.

Track listing

Singaporean release

Disc one 
 "Everytime We Touch" – 3:10
 "A Neverending Dream" – 3:23
 "Bad Boy" – 3:13
 "How Do You Do!" – 2:52
 "Another You" – 3:38
 "Miracle" – 3:39
 "Can't Stop the Rain" – 3:29
 "Kids in America" – 3:01
 "Love Again" – 3:28
 "One More Night" – 3:44
 "Truly Madly Deeply" – 4:13
 "Ready for Love" – 3:24
 "Wouldn't It Be Good" – 3:28
 "Everytime We Touch" (Yanou's Candlelight Mix) – 3:17

Disc two 
 "A Neverending Dream" (Original Club Mix) – 4:57
 "A Neverending Dream" (The Real Booty Babes Remix) – 5:59
 "Everytime We Touch" (Original Club Mix) – 5:32
 "Everytime We Touch" (Rocco Vs. Bass-T Remix) – 5:41
 "How Do You Do!" (Rob Mayth Remix) – 5:32
 "How Do You Do!" (Tune Up! Remix) – 5:29
 "Bad Boy" (Original Club Mix) – 6:16
 "Bad Boy" (Central Seven Remix) – 5:57
 "Miracle" (Original Club Mix) – 6:09
 "Miracle" (The Usual Suspects Presents EXR Remix) – 6:22

UK release 
Includes all 14 tracks from the first release (US) in rearranged order along with the following two remixes:
 "Truly Madly Deeply" (Radio Edit) – 2:57
 "Everytime We Touch" (Yanou's Candlelight mix) – 3:15

Australian release 
Includes all 14 tracks from the first release (US) in rearranged order along with the following remixes:
 "Everytime We Touch" (Club Mix) – 5:32
 "How Do You Do!" (Club Mix) – 5:05
 "A Neverending Dream" (Club Mix) – 4:58
 "A Neverending Dream" (Deepforces Remix) – 6:10
 "A Neverending Dream" (The Real Booty Babes Remix) – 5:59

Premium Edition 
Web Release: Zoo Digital: Cat: ZDS 088
 Everytime We Touch – 3:17
 Ready For Love – 3:23
 Miracle – 3:38
 How Do You Do – 3:15
 Can't Stop The Rain – 3:28
 Truly Madly Deeply (eurotrance version) – 2:55
 Wouldn't It Be Good – 3:27
 Bad Boy – 3:11
 Another You – 3:37
 A Neverending Dream – 3:22
 Love Again – 3:27
 Kids In America – 3:00
 One More Night – 3:42
 Truly Madly Deeply (pop version) – 4:11
 Everytime We Touch (Yanou's Candlelight mix) – 3:15
 Everytime We Touch (club mix) – 5:31
 Everytime We Touch (Rocco vs Bass-T remix) – 5:41
 Everytime We Touch (2-4 Grooves remix) – 6:15
 Everytime We Touch (Verano remix) – 5:51
 Ready For Love (club mix) – 4:54
 Ready For Love (ItaloBrothers New vox remix) – 5:23
 Miracle (original mix) – 6:08
 Miracle (The Hitmen remix) – 6:54
 Miracle (Alex M remix) – 6:46
 Miracle (Sunset Crew remix) – 6:21
 How Do You Do (original mix) – 5:04
 How Do You Do (Megara vs DJ Lee remix) – 7:05
 How Do You Do (Rob Mayth remix) – 5:30
 Can't Stop The Rain (club mix) – 5:03
 Can't Stop The Rain (Mainfield Hardspace remix) – 7:16
 Truly Madly Deeply (club mix) – 4:32
 Truly Madly Deeply (2-4 Grooves remix) – 6:00
 Truly Madly Deeply (Thomas Gold remix) – 8:32
 Truly Madly Deeply (Tune Up! remix) – 4:33
 Wouldn't It Be Good (club mix) – 5:07
 Bad Boy (original mix) – 6:15
 Bad Boy (Pulsedriver remix) – 5:54
 A Neverending Dream (club mix) – 4:56
 A Neverending Dream (The Real Booty Babes remix) – 5:58
 A Neverending Dream (Digital Dog remix) – 6:26
 A Neverending Dream (Deepforces remix) – 6:09
 Love Again (club mix) – 5:29
 Love Again (Rob Mayth remix) – 6:23
 Kids In America (original mix) – 4:18
 One More Night (club mix) – 5:32

Personnel 
 Frank Ehrlich – management
 Natalie Horler – vocals
 Rebecca Meek – design
 Yann "Yanou" Peifer – mixing
 Manuel "Manian" Reuter – mixing
 Joe Yannece – mastering
 Armin Zedler – photography

Chart positions

Weekly charts

Year-end charts

Certifications

Release history

References 

2006 debut albums
Cascada albums
European Border Breakers Award-winning albums